The Italian Marxist–Leninist Party (PMLI) is an anti-revisionist Marxist-Leninist communist party in Italy. Founded in Florence in 1977, the leading core of the PMLI began their political activity as they joined the Communist Party of Italy (Marxist–Leninist) (PCd'I(ml)) in 1967. The group broke away from the PCd'I(ml) in 1969 and formed the Italian Bolshevik Communist Organization Marxist–Leninist (OCBIml). In 1977, the OCBIml was transformed into the PMLI. The current General Secretary is Giovanni Scuderi.

The PMLI is opposed to the bourgeois democracy and during political elections carries out an abstentionistic propaganda. It is a communist party loyal to the teachings of  Karl Marx, Friedrich Engels, Vladimir Lenin, Joseph Stalin and Mao Zedong, named "the five teachers of the international proletariat". This movement strives for a proletarian revolution and the establishment of a "united, red and socialist Italy".

The PMLI believes that Maoism is the highest stage of the workers' movement. Soviet leader Joseph Stalin is held in high regard within the party due to his construction of the first socialist country, the Soviet Union; and to his encouragement of the creation of the other socialist countries of Eastern Europe. Consequently, the PMLI refuses Trotskyism, believing it to be an extremist and anti-communist diversion from Marxism–Leninism. Furthermore, it views the 1936 Soviet Constitution as example of the existence of the socialism in the Soviet Union. As such, the party's official newspaper is called Il Bolscevico (The Bolshevik).

The PMLI is not represented in the Italian Parliament, the European Parliament, nor in any regional or provincial assemblies.

History

Birth and first battles of Il Bolscevico 
The first founders of the PMLI that the party reminds as the "four pioneers" began their Marxist–Leninist militancy in 1967, when they joined the PCd'I(ml). They were Giovanni Scuderi, Mino Pasca, Nerina "Lucia" Paoletti and Patrizia Pierattini. Afterwards in 1969, one of the densest years of the Cultural Revolution in China, those four pioneers and other followers denounced the CPI(ML) as a revisionist party, judged the left cover of Italian Communist Party (PCI).

On 14 December 1969, the four pioneers and the Provincial Committee of Florence left the PCd'I(ml) and along with other Marxist–Leninist organizations established the OCBIml and the next day published the first number of the official newspaper, Il Bolscevico. In this number, dense of quotes of Karl Marx, Vladimir Lenin, Joseph Stalin and Mao Zedong, the Organization wrote: 

The work of the OCBIml so was mainly the one to accumulate the forces to create a revolutionary party. In 1970, the Organization was officially recognized by the Communist Party of China and the Rome Embassy invited the leaders of the Organization to the official holidays of the People's Republic of China while the Organization sent some messages to the Communist Party of China regarding its 10th National Congress and condolences when Zhou Enlai and Zhu De died. The OCBIml had a wreath near the corpse of Mao Zedong on 18 September 1976, when the funerals finished.

To achieve this "historical goal", the OCBIml immediately launched itself in the student and workers revolts of then, carrying out an abstentionist propaganda and denouncing those who they believe "false communists" as the PCI. Those were difficult years for the Organization, mainly for the lack of funds. About the history of the party, Giovanni Scuderi said: 

After having gathered dozen of militants of Tuscany, Lombardy, Sicily and Calabria, the Organization established the Italian Marxist–Leninist Party.

PMLI is born 
From 9 April to 11 April 1977, it was held in Florence the founding Congress of the PMLI. During this Congress, it was adopted the Constitution and the Program, the symbol (black hammer and sickle and Mao's head) and the party anthems. Giovanni Scuderi was unanimously acclaimed General Secretary. For the PMLI, this date ideally represents the beginning of a "new phase" for the Italian working class. The Italian Marxist–Leninists argue that the first phase (1882–1921) was dominated by reformism of the Italian Socialist Party; the second phase was dominated by revisionism of the PCI; and today it is pursued by its heirs, the Party of Communist Refoundation and the Party of Italian Communists.

Political and organizational Long March 
The PMLI had five Congresses in 1977, 1982, 1985, 1998 and 2008. The central party headquarters are in Florence.

Since its establishment, the PMLI began a complex political work. It wanted to gain more and more workers and students and to pursue its abstaining electoral campaign. Through this work, new party centres were created and the PMLI is today present in almost every region of Italy and it is particularly rooted in the South. Many cells were created, among them J. Stalin (Forlì), Red Vesuvio (Naples), Mao Zedong (Milan) and Mao (Enna) have headquarters.

Popular Unity
On 1 July 2022, the PMLI, together with other far-left parties and organizations (Confederation of the Italian Left, Atheist Democracy, Inventing the Future, The Future City, Italian Communist Party and CARC Party), became part of the "Popular Unity" coordination, with the aim of elaborating and implementing common and shared initiatives and proposals.

Ideology 
According to its statute, the PMLI has as theoretical basis "Marxism–Leninism–Mao Zedong Thought which presides its ideological, political, organizational and practical work".

Foreign contacts 
The PMLI had close contacts with the Chinese Communist Party until 1981, when it denounced Deng Xiaoping's economic reforms and broke the relationship.

The PMLI tried to have relations with the Party of Labour of Albania, but the party attacked it after Enver Hoxha rejected Maoism.

After 1975, the PMLI had a close relationship with the Communist Party of Kampuchea (CPK), even after the invasion of Cambodia by Vietnam. A PMLI leader visited a CPK-controlled zone of Cambodia in 1987. After Pol Pot's arrest in 1997, the party denounced the Khmer Rouge's betrayal. The PMLI also supported the Iranian Revolution as an anti-imperialist revolution and a party leader visited Iran in 1992.

In 1993, the PMLI took part in an International Seminar on Maoism organized by the Marxist–Leninist Party of Germany.

At the fifth plenary session of the party's central committee on 11 October 2015, the PMLI took a stance of backing the Islamic State of Iraq and the Levant against the "holy imperialist alliance" fighting it, although it also condemned its terrorist attacks in Europe and elsewhere.

References

External links 
  

1977 establishments in Italy
Anti-revisionist organizations
Neo-Stalinist parties
Communist parties in Italy
Far-left politics in Italy
Maoist organizations in Europe
Political parties established in 1977